Slobodan Branković (Serbian Cyrillic: Слободан Бранковић; born 9 December 1963) is a Serbian retired footballer.

Football career

Beginnings
Branković, born in the Banovo Brdo neighborhood of Belgrade, began his footballing career with Partizan's youth academy in 1978 where he played alongside the late Čava Dimitrijević and former Partizan head coach Vladimir Vermezović. Here he got the nickname of Kengur, the Serbian language word for kangaroo. He remained in Partizan's youth academy until 1985 when he signed with FK Rad who was then in the Yugoslav Second League. Upon signing for Rad however, he was immediately released by Milan Živadinović.

Austria
After his departure from Rad, Branković did not play anywhere for two months until he arrived in Austria for a try-out with First Vienna FC. The try-out was arranged by well-known Serbian sports commentator Vladanko Stojaković. First Vienna had just signed Argentinian great Mario Kempes. Branković was signed (this being his first professional contract with a fully professional club) and formed a formidable tandem with Kempes. Branković even earned the nickname of the Serbian Mario Kempes due to their similar playing style and similar physique.

References

External links
 
 

1963 births
Living people
Footballers from Belgrade
Serbian footballers
Expatriate footballers in Austria
Association football forwards
First Vienna FC players
SKN St. Pölten players
SK Vorwärts Steyr players
FC Admira Wacker Mödling players